The Galway Archaeological and Historical Society was founded on 21 March 1900, at the Railway Hotel, Galway. It promotes the study of the archaeology and history of the west of Ireland. Since 1900, the Society has published 70 volumes of the Journal of the Galway Archaeological and Historical Society. The first 55 volumes of this journal were available for purchase on CD-ROM but have now sold out. Back issues of JGAHS are available through the academic database JSTOR and there are some stocks remaining in hard copy.

The Society also runs a lecture series in Galway City and is involved in lobbying national and local authorities in relation to heritage matters relating to the City and County of Galway.

Further reading

 By Time Everything is Revealed:The Galway Archaeological and Historical Society, 1900-1999, Joe O'Halloran, pp. 162–182, Journal of the G.A. & H.S., Volume 53, 2001.

External links
http://www.gahs.ie/

1900 establishments in Ireland
Historical societies based in the Republic of Ireland
Historical
History of County Galway
Organizations established in 1900